Syntermes is a genus of large neotropical higher termites within the subfamily Syntermitinae. The genus is found only in South America where members are distributed widely throughout the continent, being found from the tropical rainforests of Colombia to the savannas of Brazil and Northern Argentina.

Most known species forage in the open and collect either leaf or grass litter which is stored in subterranean chambers for later consumption. The nests are primarily subterranean with epigeal mound structures built from loose dirt of varying compactness. Some species, such as Syntermes dirus, construct highly impressive mounds with the most well known being found in a large complex of mounds spanning an area the size of Great Britain in northeastern Brazil. The mounds in this complex average 2.5 meters tall and 9 meters wide and are estimated to be as old as 4,000 years. Large species such as Syntermes aculeosus are eaten in some indigenous cultures; for example in the Makiritare in the Alto Orinoco province of Venezuela, where they fish the soldiers out via a stick. A few species are known to cause some damage to cultivated plants like young Eucalyptus, peanuts, sugarcane and yams.

Identification 

Workers of this genera are highly polymorphic, with there being four distinguishable sterile worker castes. The two largest castes are male and have heavily sclerotized heads ranging from brown to yellowish. The two smallest are female and have white unsclerotized heads of different sizes. Spines on the thoracic nota are present, although not as conspicuous as in the soldiers.

The soldier caste is mostly monomorphic and likely develops from the largest male worker caste, which molts into a pre-soldier, and then into the terminal soldier molt.Soldiers have prominent spines on the thoracic nota, and unlike most other Syntermitinae soldiers, have a very short to completely absent frontal tube (nasus) on the head. Young colonies of some species have forma prima (first form) soldiers which are significantly smaller and morphologically distinct from soldiers of mature colonies. The soldiers of some Syntermes species are amongst the largest of all termites, with the soldiers of Syntermes spinosus obtaining an average dry bodyweight of 51.0±1.7 mg, comparable to the largest Macrotermes species of Africa.

The imagoes have 19-21 antenna articles (antennomeres), the same number as workers. The head is generally round, with the compound eyes and ocelli generally being proportionally smaller than the head capsule. The postclypeus is not heavily inflated such as in other Termitidae. The pronotum is mostly the same width as the head although sometimes a bit larger or narrower and mostly flat, and the fontanelle is often circular and large. The wings are long, somewhat narrow and often heavily sclerotized.

Species 

 Syntermes aculeosus
 Syntermes barbatus
 Syntermes bolivianus
 Syntermes brevimalatus
 Syntermes calvus
 Syntermes cearensis
 Syntermes chaquimayensis
 Syntermes crassilabrum
 Syntermes dirus
 Syntermes grandis
 Syntermes insidians
 Syntermes longiceps
 Syntermes magnoculus
 Syntermes molestus
 Syntermes nanus
 Syntermes obtusus
 Syntermes parallelus
 Syntermes peruanus
 Syntermes praecellens
 Syntermes spinosus
 Syntermes tanygnathus
 Syntermes territus
 Syntermes wheeleri

References 

 Termite Catalog
 en ION
 Nomenclator Zoologicus
 Constantino, R. 1995. Revision of the neotropical genus Syntermes Holmgren (Isoptera: Termitidae). The University of Kansas Science Bulletin 55(13):455-518.
 Emerson, A.E. 1945. The neotropical genus Syntermes (Isoptera: Termitidae). Bulletin of the American Museum of Natural History 83(7):427-472.
 Holmgren, N. 1909. Termitenstudien 1. Anatomische untersuchungen. Kungliga Svenska Vetenskapsakademiens Handlingar 44(3):1-215.
 Holmgren, N. 1910a. Das system der termiten. Zoologischer Anzeiger 35:284-286.
 Mathews, A.G.A. 1977. Studies on Termites from the Mato Grosso State, Brazil. Río de Janeiro: Academia Brasileira de Ciências, 267 pp.

 
Animals described in 1802
Blattodea genera